HEMA (originally an acronym for Hollandsche Eenheidsprijzen Maatschappij Amsterdam, "Hollandic Standard Prices Company Amsterdam"), is a Dutch variety chain store. The chain is characterized by relatively low pricing of generic household goods, which are mostly made by and for the chain itself, often with an original design. The current owner is Dutch billionaire Marcel Boekhoorn, but he has lost control to bondholders.

History
The first HEMA opened in Amsterdam on 4 November 1926, set up by the owners of the luxury department store De Bijenkorf. Originally, as a price-point retailer at prime locations in town centres, goods were sold using standard prices (hence its name), with everything having a standard price of 10, 25 or 50 cents, and later also 75 and 100 cents. The relative economic boom in the Netherlands in the period 1900–1930 benefited HEMA.

During World War II, a number of Jewish employees (there was a relatively high number because of the Jewish roots of the company) were murdered by the Nazis. This is commemorated every year by laying a wreath on 4 May, the Dutch Remembrance of the Dead, at the head office.

After World War II, this model could not be sustained and the standard pricing system was abandoned. But a period of rapid expansion followed: now almost every town of any importance in the Netherlands has a HEMA. Locations carry a wide variety of goods, including clothing, food, bicycle equipment, gardening tools, and office supplies.

In June 2007 Lion Capital bought the chain from Maxeda. In 2010, standard pricing was reintroduced. In 2015, HEMA was the most indispensable brand in the Netherlands for the 8th time running.

In 2020, HEMA's proprietors placed the potential sale of the business on their agenda. An investment company based in Miami, Florida (Flacks Group) and a consortium led by Amsterdam-based private equity firm Parcom Capital displayed the greatest interest in acquiring the chain. Exclusive negotiations with a 50/50 consortium of the Van Eerd Group and Parcom Capital commenced in October 2020. This was expected to put a stop to activities outside Europe.

Branches

HEMA has also expanded into other countries since the 1990s.

HEMA branches by country:

On 4 January 2014, HEMA's CEO Ronald van Zetten announced that it would branch out to Spain and the UK opening the first stores within six months as well further expanding in France. The first Spanish store opened on 3 April on Calle Fuencarral in Madrid. The first British store opened in the Victoria Place shopping centre, above Victoria station, in London on 12 June 2014, and six more followed, but by the summer of 2021, all had been closed.

References

External links
 
 

Department stores of the Netherlands
Privately held companies of the Netherlands
Retail companies of the Netherlands
Retail companies established in 1926
Discount stores
Dutch brands
2007 mergers and acquisitions
2018 mergers and acquisitions
Variety stores
Companies that filed for Chapter 11 bankruptcy in 2020